The John Abbott House is an historic house located on King Street in Abbottstown, Adams County, Pennsylvania, United States. It was listed on the National Register of Historic Places on February 22, 1980.

Description and history 
It is a two-story wood, stone and brick building. It consists of the original log dwelling dated to about 1740, and sheathed in clapboard, with an extension added between 1830 and 1850, incorporating the original stone kitchen and brick addition. A one-story wood lean-to was added between 1915 and 1930. The house operated as a tavern between 1750 and about 1763.

Restoration work was completed on the home in 1981 by the home's owner, Yvonne Nace; Thomas Spiers, her consulting architect; her contractor, Edward H. Nace; William Helker, carpenter; and Ralph Miller, painter.

It was listed on the National Register of Historic Places on February 22, 1980.

See also
National Register of Historic Places listings in Adams County, Pennsylvania

References

External links
 "Exploring Pennsylvania Boroughs: Abbottstown and Carroll Valley." Camp Hill, Pennsylvania: PCNTV, retrieved online September 24, 2019.
 John Abbott House. Waymarking.com, retrieved online September 24, 2019.

Houses on the National Register of Historic Places in Pennsylvania
Houses in Adams County, Pennsylvania
National Register of Historic Places in Adams County, Pennsylvania